Benedictum is an American heavy metal band formed in 2005 in San Diego, California that now resides in Phoenix, Arizona. Their current line-up consists of vocalist Veronica Freeman, guitarist Pete Wells, bassist Aric Avina, and drummer Rikard Stjernquist. Since their formation the band released four studio albums, debuting with Uncreation in 2006, followed by Seasons of Tragedy in 2008, both through Spain-based label Locomotive Music, before signing with Italian label Frontiers Records for their third album, Dominion, issued in 2011.

Their fourth album Obey was released on Frontiers Records in Europe on November 29, 2013 and in the U.S. on December 3, 2013.

History

Band formation
Benedictum was formed originally as Bound by vocalist Veronica Freeman and guitarist Pete Wells in San Diego, California in 2005. The two founding members had been in the band known as Malady for over ten years. Freeman and Wells recruited drummer Blackie Sanchez and keyboardist Chris Morgan, whom Freeman had played with in the Dio tribute band Evilution. Freeman's acquaintance with Dio's guitarist Craig Goldy, brought the band to meet the former Dio and Dokken bass player Jeff Pilson, who produced their first three-track demo and contributed playing bass guitar. In late 2005, they signed a record deal with the Spanish label Locomotive Records.

History
After signing with Locomotive Records, Benedictum entered in the studio to record their debut album with production by Jeff Pilson and mixing by Pilson and former Warlock member Tommy Henriksen. The band recorded eleven songs including the covers of Black Sabbath′s songs "Heaven and Hell" and "The Mob Rules", songs the group members had played for years in tribute bands. Both the former Rainbow and Dio member Jimmy Bain and Craig Goldy played as guests on the album. Uncreation was initially due to be released on October 17, 2005, but was delayed to January 20, 2006, according with statement of vocalist Veronica Freeman:

Garnering strong reviews for Uncreation, including a "bands to watch in 2006" pick by the British magazine Classic Rock, the band toured Europe for the first time in the summer of that same year, kicking things off at Italy's massive Gods of Metal festival near Milan. Benedictum also landed a slot on the Winter 2006 Doro European tour.

Their 2008 sophomore release, Seasons of Tragedy, saw the group continue their close working relationship with mentor/producer Jeff Pilson who brought in former Dokken bandmate George Lynch to contribute guest guitar solos on "Bare Bones" and a cover of the Accept track "Balls to the Wall". Long-time friend, guitarist Craig Goldy, also made an appearance on the album. The band supported the album in Europe with several festival shows and completed a fall tour with NWOBHM veterans Girlschool.

With regard to Seasons of Tragedy, Allmusic reviewer Stewart Mason stated that "Singer Veronica Freeman has a powerful, hectoring voice, similar at times to Grace Slick's potent bellow from the Jefferson Starship days, and keyboardist Chris Morgan prefers to add subtle coloration and powerful drone parts rather than lame Keith Emerson-style twiddling."

Prior to commencing work on their third album, Dominion, the band underwent significant line-up changes with only core members Veronica Freeman and Pete Wells remaining. Benedictum would also leave their original record company, Locomotive Music, and sign a new deal with Frontiers Records. Due to Jeff Pilson's commitments with Foreigner, main producing duties for the new album were handled by Grammy Award winning engineer/producer, Ryan Greene, whose credits include Megadeth and NOFX. Pilson and Craig Goldy would make guest appearances on the album as did legendary bassist Rudy Sarzo on the song "Bang". Continuing the tradition of covering at least one cover track on each album, the band cut "Overture" / "The Temples of Syrinx" / "Grand Finale" off of 2112 by Rush, which is featured as a bonus track.

New members Rikard Stjernquist (ex-Jag Panzer) on drums and Aric Avina on bass were recruited in 2012 to record their latest album Obey, released in November 2013.

Discography

Studio albums
Uncreation (2006)
Seasons of Tragedy (2008)
Dominion (2011)
 Obey (2013)

Members

Current members
Veronica Freeman – vocals
Pete Wells – guitar
Aric Avina – bass
Rikard Stjernquist – drums

Former members
Blackie Sanchez – drums
Jesse Wright - bass
Chris Morgan - keyboards
Paul Courtois - drums
Chris Shrum – bass
Tony Diaz - keyboards
Mikey Pannone - drums

Timeline

Notes and references

External links
 

Heavy metal musical groups from California
Musical groups from San Diego
Musical groups established in 2005
Frontiers Records artists
Locomotive Music artists
American power metal musical groups